Parthiban Kanavu is 1942 Tamil novel.

Parthiban Kanavu may also refer to:
 Parthiban Kanavu (1960 film), Tamil film
 Parthiban Kanavu (2003 film), Tamil film